The Katsina Ala (or Katsina-Ala) is a river in central Nigeria, located within its Middle Belt. It serves as a major tributary of the Benue River in Nigeria. The source of the river is found in the Bamenda highlands in northwestern Cameroon.

Location 
The River Katsina Ala is found mainly in Benue State of Nigeria, after crossing the border between Nigeria and Cameroon, before emptying its contents into the Benue River.

Towns 
Katsina-Ala is the capital and major town of Katsina Ala local government in Benue State, Nigeria. It is found along the course of river Katsina Ala with numerous hamlets and villages along the road. It has a central market that holds every Thursdays of the week.

References 

Rivers of Cameroon
Rivers of Nigeria
International rivers of Africa